Detroit Metropolitan Wayne County Airport , usually called Detroit Metro Airport, Detroit Metro, Metro Airport, or simply DTW, is a major international airport in the United States covering  in Romulus, Michigan. It is the primary international airport serving Detroit and is Michigan's busiest airport. The Federal Aviation Administration (FAA) National Plan of Integrated Airport Systems for 2017–2021 categorized it as a large hub primary commercial service facility.

The airport is a major hub for Delta Air Lines and is also a base for Spirit Airlines. Detroit serves as Delta's main gateway to Asia for the Eastern United States. The airport has service to 30 international destinations and service to 39 states across the United States. Operated by the Wayne County Airport Authority, the airport has six runways, two terminals, and 129 in-service gates. Detroit Metropolitan Airport has maintenance facilities capable of servicing and repairing aircraft as large as the Boeing 747-400.

The airport serves over 140 destinations and was named the best large U.S. airport in customer satisfaction by J.D. Power & Associates in 2010 and 2019.

History
Wayne County began to plan an airport in the western townships of the county as early as 1927. Construction was completed in 1929, and the first landing was on February 22, 1930; Wayne County Airport was dedicated on September 4, 1930. That year Thompson Aeronautical Corporation, a forerunner of American Airlines, began service from the airport. From 1931 until 1945, the airport hosted Michigan Air National Guard operations gained by the United States Army Air Forces. It was named Romulus Field during the war; it was then all east of Merriman Road and north of Goddard Road.

Wayne County expanded the airport to become Detroit's primary airport. It renamed it Detroit-Wayne Major Airport in 1947, and in the next three years expanded threefold as three more runways were built. In 1949 the airport added runways 3L/21R and 9L/27R, followed by runway 4R/22L in 1950.

Pan-Am (1954) and BOAC (1956) were the first passenger airlines at Detroit-Wayne Major. In the April 1957 Official Airline Guide they were the only passenger airlines: three Pan Am DC-7Cs each week FRA–LHR–SNN–DTW–ORD and back, and one BOAC DC-7C each week LHR–PIK–YUL–DTW–ORD and back (skipping YUL on the return flight).

Aerial photographs of DTW from 1949 and 1956 show the airport's expansion. In 1958 the Civil Aviation Administration—now the Federal Aviation Administration (FAA)—announced the inclusion of Detroit-Wayne in the first group of American airports to receive new long-range radar equipment, enabling the airport to become the first inland airport in the United States certified for jet airliners. Also, in 1958, airport management completed the Leroy C. Smith (South) Terminal and gave the airport its present name.

American Airlines moved from Willow Run to Detroit-Wayne in October 1958, followed by Northwest, Allegheny, and Delta in the next few months; the other airlines stayed at Willow Run until 1966.

Northwest's flights to Minneapolis were DTW's only nonstops west beyond Chicago and Milwaukee until 1966. The first scheduled jets were Delta DC-8s to Miami in late 1959. The North Terminal (later renamed the James M. Davey Terminal) opened in 1966, which was located on the current site of the Evans Terminal.  A third terminal, the Michael Berry International Terminal, opened in 1974. The last of its original three parallel runways (3R/21L) was completed in 1976; a new parallel crosswind runway (9R/27L) opened in 1993.

Republic Airlines began hub operations in 1984, and its merger with Northwest Airlines in 1986 expanded the hub. The Northwest hub operated out of the Davey Terminal throughout the 1980s and 1990s.  Transpacific flights began in 1987, with Northwest providing nonstop service to Tokyo–Narita. The last of Metro's six runways (4L/22R) was completed in December 2001 in preparation for the opening of the mile-long, 122-gate, $1.2 billion McNamara Terminal in the airport midfield in 2002. The airport remained a hub for Northwest Airlines until it merged with Delta Air Lines.

The present Runway 3L/21R has had four identifiers. When it opened in 1949, it was Runway 3/21. With the opening of the new west side Runway 3L/21R in 1950, the original 3/21 became 3R/21L. With the opening of the new east side Runway 3R/21L in 1976, it became 3C/21C. With the opening of Runway 4L/22R in December 2001 and the splitting of the field into two sectors (3/21 on the east and 4/22 on the west), Runway 3C/21C became Runway 3L/21R.

In 2009, Detroit Metro Airport launched its first social media efforts with participation in Twitter, Facebook, and YouTube networks.

Detroit was a major hub for Northwest Airlines from 1986 to 2010; Northwest merged with Delta Air Lines, and Detroit became Delta's second-largest hub.

In April 2011 Lufthansa launched a unique curbside check-in and baggage check service for premium customers from DTW's North Terminal to Frankfurt and beyond. Lufthansa became the only airline allowing international customers departing from DTW to check their bags and receive a boarding pass at the curb, while DTW becomes Lufthansa's first North American gateway with this service.

Detroit's economy plunged in the Great Recession, causing airlines such as British Airways to drop flights to London–Heathrow and other airlines such as KLM Royal Dutch Airlines and Virgin Atlantic to use codeshare flights through Delta Air Lines. The city has lost population, but Detroit Metropolitan Airport has since re-grown, and airlines are looking to expand or resume service. JetBlue Airways began flights to Boston in February 2014. United Airlines resumed nonstop flights to San Francisco in June 2017 in efforts to boost competition in Detroit. Spirit Airlines has grown at DTW, adding service to more East and West Coast cities. Spirit has increased its market share to over 10%, widening the gap as Metro Airport's second largest carrier.

Royal Jordanian was the first airline to schedule the Boeing 787 Dreamliner into Detroit, on December 1, 2014.

One of Delta Connection carriers, Compass Airlines chose to close its operating base in Detroit to move operations to the new Seattle hub in early 2015. Delta has replaced many of the existing Compass flights with mainline Delta flights to allow SkyWest Airlines and GoJet to open Detroit bases.

Beginning in January 2018 Suburban Mobility Authority for Regional Transportation, or SMART Bus, began providing a direct connection from the airport to the Rosa Parks Transit Center in downtown Detroit via route 261, also known as the Michigan Ave FAST bus, with stations at both the McNamara and Evans terminals.

On June 26, 2015, Spirit Airlines announced the construction of a new maintenance facility, saying it would bring $31.5 million and 82 jobs to the area. Spirit previously had a hangar that closed, forcing the airline to do maintenance at the gate with contract workers. With the new facility, which opened in May 2017, Spirit will retain its operating base at Metro Airport and bring more flights.  Spirit was also the first airline to regularly fly the A320neo in the US, the first route was Detroit to Los Angeles as well as add self-tagging luggage kiosks at DTW.

In 2017, WOW Air announced service to Reykjavik on the Airbus A321. This marked the first ever entrance of a modern European low-cost carrier to DTW. In the summer of 2018, Reykjavik went from the 55th most traveled destination to the fifth due to this flight's popularity. Passengers could connect onwards in Reykjavik, boosting travel to European destinations. In March 2019, the airline ceased operations, leaving Metro Airport with no low-cost nonstop to Europe; the airport looked for replacement service to begin in 2020, but due the COVID pandemic, that effort ceased until 2022, when Icelandair and Delta announced seasonal flights to Reykjavík starting in 2023.

In October 2021, Turkish Airlines announced the intent to serve Detroit. The airline made the decision to serve Detroit "based on market conditions." Although this was formally announced, no start date has been given for either Detroit or Denver, likely due to the delivery schedule of aircraft that are capable to serve the route.

Facilities

Edward H. McNamara Terminal

DTW has 4 concourses with a total of 129 gates. The McNamara Terminal, also once known as the Northwest WorldGateway, opened February 24, 2002. Designed by SmithGroup and built by Hunt Construction Group, it replaced the aged Davey Terminal. During development, the terminal was known as the Midfield Terminal. The terminal is used exclusively by Delta (which merged with Northwest) and Delta partners Aeromexico and Air France. This terminal has three concourses, A, B, and C, which house 103 gates with shopping and dining in the center of A concourse (known as the Central Link), as well as throughout the concourses. In addition to moving walkways spaced along the length of each concourse, Concourse A has a people mover, the ExpressTram. It transports passengers between each end of Concourse A in just over three minutes. Trams arrive almost simultaneously at the Terminal Station, in the midpoint of the concourse and depart in opposite directions to the North Station and the South Station, then return. The McNamara Terminal opened a new baggage sorting facility in October 2008, which has improved the screening of baggage through 14 new explosive detection system devices along a fully automated conveyor system. Northwest Airlines said that it reduced the amount of lost baggage, and it improved the timeliness of bags getting to their correct flight.

An AAA Four Star Westin hotel is connected to the A concourse. Additionally, overnight guests at the hotel who are not flying can obtain a pass to enter the concourses to visit shops and restaurants. Called the Airport Access Authorization to Commercial Establishments Beyond the Screen Checkpoint (AAACE), registered guests must be cleared through the same security background check (Secure Flight) and TSA screening process as travelers to access the terminal area. Dallas/Fort Worth International Airport is the only other airport participating in this program.

The A concourse houses 62 gates with 12 gates used for international departures and arrivals processing. The A concourse is intended for all aircraft. At the midpoint of the concourse is a large, laminar flow water feature designed by WET. The A concourse also includes a pet relief area for passengers traveling with pets and service animals. Signage through the terminal is in English, along with Japanese, due to a large number of business travelers from Japan. Izumi Suzuki, a Sheraton employee, and several colleagues provided the Japanese translations used by the airport. In previous eras many Japanese travelers going through Detroit missed connections due to a lack of English comprehension. Also, messages reminding travelers to configure watches to the Eastern Time Zone regularly broadcast through the public address system are said in English, Japanese, and Mandarin.

In addition to the ticketing level, there's an additional ticketing and security area for passengers using the parking structures.

The terminal houses ten international gates that are capable of dual jet bridge loading and unloading. The gates contain two exit configurations depending on the arriving flight. Domestic arrivals follow an upper path directly into the terminal, while international arrivals proceed downstairs to customs and immigration screening. The Customs and Border Protection processing center located in the terminal's lower level is designed to accommodate as many as 3,200 passengers per hour. International arriving passengers connecting to another flight are screened by TSA at a dedicated screening checkpoint within the international arrivals facility. Those passengers then exit directly back into the center of the A concourse. Passengers arriving from international destinations who end their trip in Detroit (or connecting to a flight via Evans Terminal) exit directly into a dedicated International Arrivals Hall on the lower level of the terminal.

The B and C concourses currently have 41 gates that are used for Delta's regional flights that employ smaller aircraft. All regional flights have jet bridges, eliminating the need for outdoor boarding.

The B and C concourses are connected to the main terminal building and the A concourse by a pedestrian walkway under the Airport ramp. This walkway, known as the Light Tunnel, features an elaborate multi-colored light show behind sculpted glass panels extending the entire length of the walkway, as well as several moving walkways. The light patterns are synchronized with an original musical score composed by Victor Alexeeff, which runs for nearly 30 minutes before repeating. This installation, one of the first large-scale uses of color-changing LED lighting in the United States, was produced by Mills James Productions with glasswork by Foxfire Glass Works of Pontiac, Michigan. The display won multiple lighting design awards, including the prestigious Guth Award of Merit. For passengers prone to medical conditions such as seizures, buttons at each end of the tunnel will suspend the light show for five minutes so they can pass through with no adverse effects.

The terminal has undergone updates that include new electronic terminal directories to assist passengers better. A unique feature of this is that passengers can scan their boarding passes, and the screen will direct them to the gate from which their plane departs.  The passenger can also choose to view the information in other languages. Passengers may select a restaurant on the touch screen, and a menu will show what items the restaurant serves. Mini tablet devices and phone/tablet apps have been installed in food court areas, where travelers may order food and have it delivered to their table.

There are five Delta Sky Clubs located in the McNamara terminal. The largest is located above the central link across from gate A38. Next to that, across from gate A43, houses a smaller Sky Club. There are two satellite Sky Clubs in Concourse A located on the upper level near gates A18 and A68, across from their respective ExpressTram stations. An additional Sky Club is located in Concourse C, at gate level near the entrance to Concourse C. This lounge services Delta Connection flights in concourses B & C.

Evans Terminal (formerly North Terminal)

The Warren Cleage Evans Terminal, formerly known as the North Terminal, was designed by Gensler and built by Walbridge/Barton Malow Joint Venture, opened September 17, 2008, as the replacement for the aged Berry and Smith terminals, which housed all non-SkyTeam airlines. It used to be known as the North Terminal until it was renamed in 2022. Initially, Wayne County Airport Authority sought bids for the naming rights of the North Terminal.  After two years with no successful offers, however, the effort ceased and the North Terminal name remained. 
The terminal currently houses all non-SkyTeam airlines serving the airport and is considered D Concourse. (Concourses A, B, and C are housed in the McNamara Terminal) The concourse has 29 gates, two of which opened in the middle of 2009 to accommodate international wide-body aircraft. The two gates were unusable at the building's opening because they were extremely close to Smith Terminal's C concourse, which was demolished after operations moved to the new facility. The terminal features four long segments of moving walkways on the departures level and another moving walkway on the lower level, for international arriving passengers to access the Federal Inspection Services area.

Airlines that utilize the North Terminal include Air Canada, Alaska, American, American Eagle, Frontier, JetBlue, Lufthansa, Royal Jordanian, Southwest, Spirit, United, United Express, and all non-SkyTeam and non-Delta partner charters.

The North Terminal houses two six-lane security checkpoints. The terminal also has U.S. Customs & Border Protection inspection facilities located on the lower level for arriving international flights.

This terminal includes a brand new service pet relief area to accommodate passengers traveling with pets.

The North Terminal has five common-use domestic baggage carousels on the lower level. Two additional carousels are located inside the Federal Inspection Services area for international flights, and a central Oversize Baggage Claim is adjacent to both the international and domestic carousel areas.

On January 29, 2010, the North Terminal was named winner of the "Build Michigan" award project.

The North Terminal is home to a Lufthansa Business and Senator Lounge located between Gates D7 and D8. This lounge is accessible to passengers flying in Lufthansa premium cabins as well as select Lufthansa and Star Alliance elite members. This lounge also grants access to Priority Pass members outside of peak hours.

Ground transportation
The airport is accessible from I-94 via Merriman Road (exit 198), which is the nearest entrance to the Evans Terminal, and from I-275 via Eureka Road (exit 15), which is closer to the McNamara Terminal. Both entrances and the terminals are connected by John D. Dingell Drive, an expressway completed in 1999 and named after the longtime Congressman.  Cell phone lots are located near both entrances.

Free shuttle buses are available between the two terminals, and also connect to the Green parking lots. Rental car companies provide their own shuttles, as do private offsite parking lots and most hotels in the airport's vicinity.

Metro Airport is also accessible by transit, with service from three SMART bus routes. Both terminals are served by the Michigan FAST (route 261), a limited-stop route to downtown Detroit, and route 125, a local route to communities in the Downriver region of southern Wayne County. Route 280, an hourly local route to suburbs in western Wayne County, serves only the Evans Terminal.

Metro Airport is linked to Ann Arbor, Brighton, and East Lansing by the Michigan Flyer, an intercity bus operated by Indian Trails. The Michigan Flyer began service in 2006, and currently makes twelve round trips daily. Private buses, operated by Robert Q, are also available to Windsor, London, and other locations in southern Ontario.

Airlines and destinations

Passenger

Statistics

Top destinations

Airline market share

Annual traffic

Accidents and incidents
 December 30, 1963, a Zantop Air Transport C-46 Commando with 4 occupants crashed 2.2 miles SW of DTW, killing all aboard. A loss of control during a night instrument approach in adverse weather was the probable cause.
 June 12, 1972, after a stopover in Detroit, American Airlines Flight 96, a McDonnell Douglas DC-10-10 with 56 passengers and 11 crew from Los Angeles International Airport en route to Buffalo, New York, suffered a cargo door failure and explosive decompression shortly after departure from Detroit Metropolitan Airport while flying over Windsor, Ontario. It is thus sometimes referred to as the Windsor incident. The aircraft sustained damage that left the pilots without full flight controls but the plane returned to Detroit for a successful emergency landing. There were no fatalities but several serious to minor injuries.
 July 31, 1972, Delta Air Lines Flight 841; members of the Black Liberation Army took over the airplane in flight using weapons smuggled on board, including a Bible, cut out to hold a handgun. The plane held seven crew and 94 passengers, none of whom was killed during the hijacking. Five hijackers who had boarded with three children took over the plane. The plane flew to Miami, where the passengers were exchanged for $1 million in ransom. The plane was then flown on to Boston, where it refueled before flying to Algeria. Algeria seized the plane and ransom, which they returned to the U.S., but the hijackers were released after a few days.
 December 15, 1972, a Zantop International Airlines Learjet 23, a ferry flight, crashed after failing to climb from runway 3R, hitting a fuel storage tank. Both occupants on board and 1 on the ground were killed. Cause undetermined.
 January 19, 1979, a Learjet 25 operated by Massey Ferguson rolled violently and crashed on approach to runway 09. The probable causes were icing, wake vortex by a preceding McDonnell Douglas DC-9 and a delayed application of engine thrust during an attempted go-around. All six occupants (two crew, four passengers) were killed. 
On April 4, 1979, TWA Flight 841 (1979) went into a dive above Saginaw, Michigan. The flight made an emergency landing at DTW. 
 January 11, 1983, United Airlines Flight 2885, a McDonnell Douglas DC-8F cargo flight with 3 occupants aboard crashed after takeoff due to a mistrimmed stabilizer causing a loss of control, all on board were killed.
 March 4, 1987, Northwest Airlink Flight 2268, operated by Fischer Brothers Aviation, a CASA 212 was on a scheduled flight from Mansfield to Detroit with an intermediate stop in Cleveland when it crashed while landing at Detroit Metropolitan Wayne County Airport. Of 19 occupants onboard (16 passengers and three crew), nine were killed. The cause of the crash was determined to be pilot error.
 August 16, 1987, a McDonnell Douglas MD-82 operating as Northwest Airlines Flight 255, bound for Phoenix, Arizona, crashed on take-off from Metro's  Runway 3 Center (Now Runway 3L). All but one passenger on the aircraft were killed; the lone survivor was a young girl, Cecelia Cichan, who lost both of her parents and her brother. The NTSB determined that the accident resulted from flight crew's failure to deploy the aircraft's flaps prior to take-off, resulting in a lack of necessary lift. The aircraft slammed into an overpass bridge on I-94 just northeast of the departure end of the runway.
 December 3, 1990, a McDonnell Douglas DC-9-14 operating as Northwest Airlines Flight 1482, bound for Pittsburgh, collided with a Boeing 727-200 Adv. operating as Northwest Airlines Flight 299, bound for Memphis, on runway 03C. Seven passengers and a flight attendant on Flight 1482 were killed. The cause of the accident is listed as "pilot error".
 January 9, 1997, an Embraer EMB 120 Brasilia aircraft operating as Comair Flight 3272 crashed nose down  from the airport while on approach into Detroit. All 26 passengers and 3 crew members were killed. The cause is listed to be the "FAA's failure to establish adequate aircraft certification standards for flight in icing conditions, the FAA's failure to ensure that an FAA/CTA-approved procedure for the accident airplane's deice system operation was implemented by U.S.-based air carriers, and the FAA's failure to require the establishment of adequate minimum airspeeds for icing conditions."
March 17, 2001, an Airbus A320-200 operating as Northwest Airlines Flight 985 bound for Miami, Florida, prematurely rotated during takeoff from runway 3C. The captain aborted the takeoff, and the aircraft skidded off the runway. All 151 occupants survived. The cause of the accident was the captain's delayed rejection of the takeoff, and the flight crew had incorrectly set the trim of the horizontal stabilizer.
December 25, 2009, Nigerian national Umar Farouk Abdulmutallab attempted to detonate an explosive device on Northwest Airlines Flight 253, an Airbus A330 from Amsterdam to Detroit as the plane was approaching Detroit. The device failed to go off correctly, and the suspect suffered burns to his lower body. Three other passengers had minor injuries. The White House said it considered the incident an attempted terrorist attack.

See also

 Detroit Region Aerotropolis
 United States v. Mendenhall
 Bishop International Airport
 Michigan World War II Army Airfields
 Selfridge Air National Guard Base
 Windsor International Airport

References

External links

 
 Wayne County-Detroit Metro Airport History
 Detroit Spotters
 
 
 Preferred Development Plan

 
1930 establishments in Michigan
Airports established in 1930
Economy of Metro Detroit
Airports in Wayne County, Michigan
Economy of Detroit
Airfields of the United States Army Air Forces in Michigan
Airfields of the United States Army Air Forces Air Transport Command in North America
Romulus, Michigan